Miloslav Kejval (born 11 July 1973) is a Czech former cyclist. He competed in the individual road race at the 1992 Summer Olympics.

References

External links
 

1973 births
People from Havlíčkův Brod District
Living people
Czech male cyclists
Olympic cyclists of Czechoslovakia
Cyclists at the 1992 Summer Olympics